Sturisoma barbatum is a species of armored catfish native to Argentina and Brazil where it is found in the Paraguay River basin with reports that it can also be found in the Paraná and Uruguay River basins.  This species grows to a length of  SL.

References
 

Sturisoma
Fish of South America
Fish of Argentina
Fish of Brazil
Fish described in 1853